Jeffrey James or Jeff James may refer to:

 Jeffrey James, Australian news anchor
 Jeff James (baseball), American Major League Baseball player
 Jeff James (musician), Hawaiian singer and record producer
 Jeff James (public servant), British public servant and executive

See also
 Geoffrey James (disambiguation)